"Black Magic" is a song recorded by British girl group Little Mix, released on 21 May 2015 through Syco Music and Columbia Records as the lead single from their third studio album, Get Weird (2015). The single received acclaim from music critics upon release, who praised it for its catchy sound and upbeat tempo, and comparisons were made with the songs from their debut album, DNA (2012).

"Black Magic" is a teen pop, and dance pop song with influences of 80s pop music. It topped the UK Singles Chart, the first Little Mix single to do so since "Wings" in 2012 and the first song by an all-female group to reach number one since Icona Pop released "I Love It" in 2013. It remained at number one for three consecutive weeks, becoming the first song by a girl group to spend more than a single week at number one since "About You Now" by Sugababes in 2007. It was named by the Official Charts Company, as the fifth biggest selling girl group single in the UK.

Outside of the United Kingdom, it peaked within the top ten in six other music markets and charted in 16 additional countries. On the Billboard Hot 100, the single peaked at number 67, becoming the group's highest-charting single to date in the US. As of 2021, the song has been certified triple platinum in the UK by the British Phonographic Industry (BPI) and gold or higher in ten other countries, including diamond in Brazil. The song was nominated for Choice Love Song at the 2015 Teen Choice Awards, and for British Single of the Year and British Video of the Year at the 2016 Brit Awards. Billboard ranked the song as one of the 100 Greatest Girl Group Songs of All Time.

Background and release

On 4 July 2014, Little Mix announced that they would cancel the US leg of their second concert tour, The Salute Tour, to focus on recording their third album. The group said that the new album would be "stronger" and "better" than their two previous albums, DNA (2012) and Salute (2013). In February 2015, Little Mix revealed that they had chosen the lead single from their third studio album and also said that it has a "whole new sound" compared to previous material. They described the song as "a risk" and said that it is completely different from what they have done before. Album delays were attributed to the fact that Little Mix's original output was scrapped because they thought "they could do better".

The song's title was accidentally revealed by member Leigh-Anne Pinnock's mother on Twitter on 21 April 2015 when she tweeted "#MixersAreExcitedForBlackMagic yesss mixers it's the new single and it's fantastic". However, the tweet was deleted shortly after it was posted. On 14 May 2015, Little Mix revealed that the song was titled "Black Magic", after the single's cover art surfaced on music identification service Shazam. The single's cover features the group in front of red school lockers with the group's logo featured above the group in a yellow colour and the title of the song below in white. "Black Magic" was scheduled to premiere on 26 May, but was later moved forward to 21 May, after the single leaked online the day before. The single was released digitally in the UK on 20 May. It was released as a CD single in Europe on 17 July 2015, and in Japan on 12 August 2015 with an exclusive Japanese edition.

In 2022, the song was included on Now That's What I Call Music! soundtrack, to celebrate 70 years of the Official Singles Charts.

Composition

"Black Magic" is a dance-pop and teen pop song that runs for a total length of three minutes and thirty-one seconds. It was written by Edvard Førre Erfjord, Henrik Michelsen, Ed Drewett and Camille Purcell, and was produced by the production duo Electric, who previously worked on the group's second studio album. The song's rhythm is influenced by the sounds of the 1980s dance music. The song has a quick tempo of 112 beats per minute and is composed in the key of E major. The group's vocal range in the song runs from G#3 to E5.

Talking about the song's message, the group said, "we are the girls with the secret potion and we're going to give it to all the other girls that want to get the man they want to get", with Pinnock adding that "It [the potion] is a metaphor for having confidence to get your man".

Critical reception

Upon its release, "Black Magic" was acclaimed by music critics, who welcomed Little Mix's new '80s-influenced sound. Matt Bagwell of The Huffington Post called the single "one of the best pop releases of the year", complimenting its "killer chorus" and "trademark call to arms chant", while writing that "Black Magic" is "significantly better" than Britney Spears and Iggy Azalea's single "Pretty Girls", which Little Mix co-wrote. Lewis Corner of Digital Spy gave the song a 5 out of 5 star rating, saying "not only was it the perfect song for this point in their career, but one powerful enough to bewitch those beyond their expected demographic."

Ariana Bacle of Entertainment Weekly described the song as "bouncy" and "incredibly catchy". Jocelyn Vena of Billboard noted Little Mix's "soaring vocals over a shimmery melody". The Guardian compared the song to the "carefree joy" of Whitney Houston's "I Wanna Dance with Somebody (Who Loves Me)" and Cyndi Lauper's "Girls Just Want to Have Fun", while also comparing the song to those of their debut album DNA.

Renowned for Sound described the song as "fun and catchy" and went on to compare the song to the group's previous work for its familiar chemistry and the overall feel good vibe it presents, "it's generic pop with a snappy melody and a neat call and response bridge". Madeline Roth of MTV stated that the track "is an up-tempo jam featuring summery vibes and bewitching lyrics". Writing for Idolator, Mike Wass says that the song is "preternaturally catchy" and describes the chorus of the song as "addictive". Billboard ranked the song at number 34 on their list of 100 Greatest Girl Group Songs of All Time.

Attitude ranked the song #10 on their list of 32 greatest Little Mix singles writing "Around the time of ‘Black Magic’, the girls were in an uncertain place, with fears of even being dropped. But this came out of nowhere and stormed in at Number One for an impressive three weeks, kick-starting new level of stardom for the girls." Rolling Stone also added that "Black Magic is an enthusiastic, dance-pop stomper".

Big Top 40, named Black Magic as one of the best pop songs of 2015. Time Out also included it on their list of 100 best songs of 2015. Pitchfork added it to their list of Best Songs of the 2010s.PopSugar included it on their list as one of the 50 Most Iconic Pop Music Videos of the Decade. forbes added that "Black Magic" was one of the Biggest Songs In The UK In 2015. According to the Official Charts "Black Magic" was included as one of the most streamed songs of all time in the UK.

Chart performance
"Black Magic" entered at number one on the UK Singles Chart, becoming Little Mix's first UK number-one since their 2012 single "Wings". It spent three consecutive weeks at number one, becoming the longest-running number-one by a girl group since "About You Now" by Sugababes in 2007. In its first week, the song had combined sales of 112,684, including 1.19 million streams. In its second week the song remained at number one and had combined sales of 65,720, including almost 1.88 million streams. In its third week the song continued at number one with combined sales of 59,887, including 1.97 million streams. On 13 November 2015, the song was certified platinum in the United Kingdom for combined sales exceeding 600,000, becoming the first single by a UK girl group in more than a decade to achieve a platinum certification. The song was ranked as the sixth biggest summer song of 2015 by the Official Charts Company.

On the Irish Singles Chart, "Black Magic" peaked at number three. In Australia, the song debuted at number 25 on the Australian Singles Chart and peaked at number eight two weeks later. The song also charted on both Ultratip Belgian airplay charts, where it peaked at number four and number 37 on the Flanders and Wallonia charts, respectively. It also topped the European digital downloads chart. On the Israeli television airplay chart, the song peaked at number five.

In the United States, the song entered at number 99 on the US Billboard Hot 100 in the week ending 29 August 2015, becoming the group's first entry on the chart since "Wings". In its second week on the Billboard Hot 100, it climbed 31 spots to number 68; it achieved a new peak of 67 in its third week on the Hot 100, becoming the group's highest charting US single to date.

Music video

Background and synopsis

On 21 May 2015, Little Mix posted the audio video of the song on their Vevo account. The music video for the song was directed by Director X, and was filmed at the University of Southern California on 22–23 May 2015 in Los Angeles. Talking about the video, Jesy Nelson also said in an interview in Capital FM that "We [the group] are acting which is exciting! They're like little mini movies which is exciting". Jade Thirlwall also said that "It's nothing like we've done before and it's like a movie". Just one day before its release, Leigh-Anne Pinnock posted on Twitter: "OMG! Can't believe the #BlackMagicVideo is live tomorrow on @Vevo_UK at 8am! So excited for you guys to see!". The video premiered online on the group's Vevo channel on 29 May 2015. Following the release of the video, the group posted several tweets on their account reacting to the fans' opinions for the music video.

After showing the campus, the video introduces Little Mixed, who are dressed as nerds. On their way out of school, they believe an attractive male student to be waving at them, only to be shoved away by a popular female student. At the local library, a spellbook falls on Jade's head. That night, the girls use the book to gain magical powers, and they undergo magical makeovers to become Little Mix. The girls then enact a number of pranks on their classmates: they make the girl from the previous day constantly flatulate, cause girls to fall in love with a geeky boy, and transform a classroom into a dance party.

Reception 

The video received positive reviews by both fans and critics. Critics noted references to witch-themed films and television shows such as The Craft, Charmed and Sabrina, the Teenage Witch, as well as the music video for "Too Much" by the Spice Girls. Both Rigby from Digital Spy and Forrester from the Daily Mirror described the video as "spellbinding". Additionally, Forrester from Mirror said that the group "turned to Katy Perry for inspiration and the results are hilarious" and also compared the scene of the girls walking down the hall with the 1999 film She's All That. Lucy Wood of Cosmopolitan said that the video is "a brilliant combo of Clueless, Sabrina The Teenage Witch and The Craft all in one go". Capital FM wrote, "Take a dash of Sabrina The Teenage Witch, add a pinch of Mean Girls and throw in a little Charmed, and you've got yourself an INCREDIBLE video!"

The acclaim for the music video was not universal. Mace Entertainment criticised the message of the video, saying that "the general message that we get from the video is that if you want people to like you, shorten the length of your clothes, plump up your hair, wear more makeup, and embarrass other people". The group then addressed the negative response on the video, saying "People are saying how it's a bad message, but really, it's a great message because what we're trying to say is with a little bit of confidence, that's all you need, and that's all we ever try to say in the video". The video peaked at number 3 on the Billboard Twitter Top Tracks on 27 June 2015.

Live performances

Little Mix performed "Black Magic" for the first time at Capital's Summertime Ball in Wembley Stadium on 6 June 2015. On 5 June 2015, the group announced the Black Magic Radio Tour, during which they would promote the song and their new music on several radio stations; the tour started on 8 June 2015 and ended on 12 June 2015. The radio tour included eighteen appearances in stations around the United Kingdom. On 14 June 2015, they performed the song on the British radio show Total Access, hosted by Elliot Holman. They also performed acoustic performances of the song for biannual magazine Hunger on 22 June 2015 and for the British music channel 4Music on 3 July 2015. On 13 July 2015, Little Mix performed the song on ITV's This Morning while on 16 July 2015, the song was performed on the thirteenth episode of CBBC's Friday Download ninth season. The group performed the song during Radio City's Summer Live in the Echo Arena alongside singers such as Rita Ora, Alesha Dixon and Nick Jonas. On 30 July 2015, Little Mix performed "Black Magic" in Plymouth during the first day of MTV Crashes Plymouth. The group performed the song in BBC Radio 1 Live Lounge before performing a mashup cover of Jason Derulo's "Want to Want Me" and Whitney Houston's "I Wanna Dance with Somebody" with a gospel choir. They also performed the song during the "Kiss Secret Sessions" for the Kiss music channel on 30 July 2015. The group appeared on the light entertainment television show Surprise Surprise to perform the song and also surprise one of their fans. On 5 September 2015, Little Mix performed the song at the Gibraltar Music Festival. Little Mix opened the Apple Music Festival in London for One Direction and performed "Black Magic" among other songs. The group performed "Black Magic" during the two concerts of the 2015 Jingle Bell Ball on 5 and 6 December 2015.

In the United States, they performed the song during The 1989 World Tour with Taylor Swift at Levi's Stadium on 15 August 2015. They also performed at the 2015 Teen Choice Awards a day later. On 17 August 2015, they performed the song on The Late Late Show with James Corden and also on The Today Show two days later. During their performance on the tenth season of America's Got Talent, the group teamed up with season nine third-placed gymnastics group AcroArmy to perform the song. On 22 August 2015, the group performed the song during the Billboard Hot 100 Music Festival. In Denmark, the group performed "Black Magic" in Tivoli Gardens for The Voice '15, the annual concert by The Voice radio station and also on the morning show Go Morgen Danmark. In Sweden, the song was performed on TV4's Sommarkrysset, and later on the Swedish version of Idol during the "Boy groups vs Girl groups" week. In the Netherlands, the group performed the song during a fan event in Utrecht. The song has been part of four of the group's concert tours including The Get Weird Tour, which supported the parent album of the song, and LM5: The Tour being the most recent.

Cover versions 
English singer Jess Glynne, who also worked with the group on their Get Weird album, covered the song on Capital FM as a part of Capital Live Sessions. It was released on Capital's YouTube channel on 11 September 2015. English boy group, Concept covered the song and added a rap part. Welsh singer-songwriter Greta Isaac, accompanied by her sisters, performed the song for Terry Wogan on BBC Radio 2 as a part of Greta Isaacs Live in Session on 9 August 2015.

Formats and track listings

Personnel and credits
Credits adapted from Tidal and the CD single of Get Weird.

Personnel

 Little Mix – lead vocals
 Electric – songwriting, production, engineering, instruments, programming
 Sam Elison – production
 Ed Drewett – songwriting
 Henrik Michelsen – songwriting, programming
 Edvard Erfjord – songwriting, programming
 Camille Purcell – songwriting, background vocals
 Maegan Cottone – vocal production
 Matt Rad – additional producer
 Serban Ghenea – mixing
 Tom Coyne – mastering
 Randy Merrill – mastering
 Chris Bishop – engineering
 John Hanes – engineering
 Dick Beetham – mastering

Recording
 Mixed at MixStar Studios, Virginia Beach, VA
 Recorded at Tileyard Studios, London, England
 Vocals recorded at Blue Bar Studios, London, England

Accolades
"Black Magic" has received a total of two awards and 7 nominations. The song won the 2015 Popjustice £20 Music Prize for Track of the Year, and Best Song of The teens at the 2018 Now! 100 Music Awards. At the 2015 Teen Choice Awards, the song was nominated for the Choice Music: Love Song category. It also received two nominations at the 2016 Brit Awards for the categories; British Single of the Year and British Video of The Year.

Charts

Weekly charts

Year-end charts

Certifications

Release history

References

2015 songs
2015 singles
Little Mix songs
Syco Music singles
Number-one singles in Scotland
UK Singles Chart number-one singles
Songs written by Ed Drewett
Songs written by Kamille (musician)
Songs written by Henrik Barman Michelsen
Songs written by Edvard Forre Erfjord
Music videos directed by Director X
Songs with feminist themes
Torch songs
Music video controversies